Lamprologus lemairii is a species of cichlid endemic to Lake Tanganyika where it prefers to lurk by rocks or on the lake bed waiting for fish to prey on.  This species can reach a length of  TL. The specific name of this fish honours the leader of the Congo Free State expedition which collected the type, Lieutenant Charles Lemaire (1863-1925).

References

Lamprologus
Fish of Lake Tanganyika
Taxa named by George Albert Boulenger
Fish described in 1899
Taxonomy articles created by Polbot